Raisa Petrovna Smetanina (born 29 February 1952) is a Soviet, Komi and Russian cross-country skiing champion. She is the first woman in history to win ten Winter Olympic medals.

Career
Smetanina took part in five Olympics, representing the Soviet team four times and the Unified Team once. In particular, Smetanina won two gold and one silver medals at the 1976 Winter Olympics, becoming the most successful athlete there, along with Rosi Mittermaier of West Germany.

In the 1992 Winter Olympics, at the age of 39, Smetanina won a further gold medal competing for the Unified Team in the 4 × 5 km relay, becoming the first woman to win ten Winter Olympic medals and at that time the oldest woman to win a Winter Olympic gold.

Smetanina also had successes at the FIS Nordic World Ski Championships, winning four golds (20 km (1982), and 4 × 5 km relay (1974, 1985, and 1991), three silvers (10 km (1978), and 4 × 5 km relay (1982, 1989)), and four bronzes (4 × 5 km relay (1978), 5 km (1974, 1978), and 20 km (1980)). She also won three times at the Holmenkollen ski festival, once in the 10 km (1975) and twice in the 5 km (1975 and 1979).

In 1979 Smetanina received the Holmenkollen medal (shared with Erik Håker and Ingemar Stenmark). She was also awarded Order of Friendship of Peoples (1984).

Cross-country skiing results
All results are sourced from the International Ski Federation (FIS).

Olympic Games
 10 medals – (4 gold, 5 silver, 1 bronze)

World Championships
 11 medals – (4 gold, 3 silver, 4 bronze)

World Cup

Season standings

Individual podiums
3 victories 
16 podiums

Team podiums

 3 victories 
 9 podiums

Note:   Until the 1999 World Championships and the 1994 Olympics, World Championship and Olympic races were included in the World Cup scoring system.

See also
 List of multiple Winter Olympic medalists
 List of multiple Olympic medalists

References

External links
 
 Holmenkollen medalists – click Holmenkollmedaljen for downloadable pdf file 
 Holmenkollen winners since 1892 – click Vinnere for downloadable pdf file 

1952 births
Living people
People from Izhemsky District
Cross-country skiers at the 1976 Winter Olympics
Cross-country skiers at the 1980 Winter Olympics
Cross-country skiers at the 1984 Winter Olympics
Cross-country skiers at the 1988 Winter Olympics
Cross-country skiers at the 1992 Winter Olympics
Holmenkollen medalists
Holmenkollen Ski Festival winners
Olympic cross-country skiers of the Unified Team
Olympic cross-country skiers of the Soviet Union
Russian female cross-country skiers
Soviet female cross-country skiers
Olympic medalists in cross-country skiing
FIS Nordic World Ski Championships medalists in cross-country skiing
Medalists at the 1984 Winter Olympics
Medalists at the 1976 Winter Olympics
Medalists at the 1980 Winter Olympics
Medalists at the 1988 Winter Olympics
Medalists at the 1992 Winter Olympics
Olympic gold medalists for the Unified Team
Olympic bronze medalists for the Soviet Union
Olympic gold medalists for the Soviet Union
Olympic silver medalists for the Soviet Union
Komi people
Sportspeople from the Komi Republic